is a private junior college in Takayama, Gunma, Japan.

History 
 1998，Junior College was established
 2001，Advanced course was set up 
 2002，The second Academic department was set up.
 2003，New campus was set up at  Takasaki, Gunma 
 2005，It was changed to four years college or Gumma Paz College.

Names of Academic department 
 Nursing
 Physical Therapy

Advanced course 
 Public Health Nursing

See also 
 List of junior colleges in Japan

External links
  

Japanese junior colleges
Universities and colleges in Gunma Prefecture